Terrain is a French academic journal of ethnology, social and cultural anthropology (the three terms are not clearly distinguished in France). Each issue is entirely devoted to a specific theme. It aims to address both specialists and the educated public; it was initially focused on contemporary France society and then extended to Europe; it also addresses theoretical considerations but with a language accessible to the public.

References

External links
Presentations:    

Anthropology journals
Cultural journals
Publications established in 1983
Delayed open access journals
Biannual journals